Apta railway station is a railway station on the Panvel–Roha route of Central Railway in India. The station is situated in Raigad district of Navi Mumbai city in Maharashtra. It is  83.24 km from Chhatrapati Shivaji Maharaj Terminus via . Its station code is APTA. It belongs to the Mumbai Railway Division of Central Railway.

Popular cultures
The last scene of Dilwale Dulhania Le Jayenge starring Shah Rukh Khan and Kajol was shot there. The action scene of the Rajkumar Santoshi's Khakee was also taken there. Other movies that were shot at this location include Bunty Aur Babli, Chinatown, Fida, Rang De Basanti, Shaadi No. 1, Swades, Slumdog Millionaire and ''Aahat (season 4 ep 1 Blara Junction).

References

Railway stations in Raigad district
Mumbai Suburban Railway stations
Panvel-Roha rail line